Mark Phooi Peck Lye (born 22 August 1962) is a Singaporean entrepreneur in the design industry. He is the founder and CEO of First Media Pte Ltd (FM), a holding company that manages a collection of design agencies and design institutions.

His first business venture at the age of 27 was a design agency he started on his own with a capital of S$2,000. He called it Lancer Design, deriving the name Lancer from the word "freelancer". At the age of 32, he earned his first million.

In 2006, Phooi founded First Media Design School (FMDS), a progressive private educational institution specialising in the field of design. In August 2011, FMDS was awarded the Council for Private Education's (CPE) four-year EduTrust mark.

Early life and education
Phooi was born in Singapore. His father worked as a contractor for PSA International and his mother was a contract labourer. At the age of 9, he joined The Singapore Scout Association(SSA) as a Sea Scout and at the age of 12, he became a qualified lifeguard.

Phooi attended his secondary school education at Tanglin Secondary School. At the age of 24, he enrolled into a Fine Arts diploma program at the Nanyang Academy of Fine Arts(NAFA), but switched to a Graphic Design pathway soon after. He graduated from NAFA in 1989 at the age of 27. In 2002, he graduated from the University of New South Wales with a Master of Design.

Career

Lifeguard and swimming coach
While waiting to be enlisted into the National Service, Phooi worked for a year as a lifeguard at Big Splash, a water theme park in Singapore that was launched in 1976. During this period, he also taught swimming to a handful of students, aged between 6 and 10 years old, on a part-time basis.

While serving his term with the Singapore Armed Forces, Phooi continued to coach swimming during his weekends to supplement his income. After his National Service term was completed, he started to teach on a full-time basis, only retiring from coaching at the age of 29.

Midway through his coaching career, Phooi embarked on a training program to attain the CLASS 1 Swimming Coach qualification. As part this program, he was attached to the People's Association swimming team, under the tutelage of the late Kee Soon Bee, a prolific national swimming coach. Kee was well known for being able to spot and groom
competitive national swimmers such as Junie Sng, Mark Chay and Joscelin Yeo.

Designpreneur
Phooi began his career as a designpreneur (entrepreneur in the design industry) by setting up Lancer Design in 1989. During its early years, he was running the company as a one-man show, which meant that he had to adopt all the required roles to sustain his company, such as being the salesman, project coordinator, creative head, planner and administrator.

In 2002, Mark established First Media Pte Ltd (FM) as a holding company for his design firms and design schools. His design agencies specialised in various design and media disciplines, such as corporate design, interactive media, events, publishing and advertising and promotion. Companies under the First Media brand include Lancer Design and Mint Editions in Singapore, Brand Smart in China, Auromedia, Discover Jakarta and Imago in Indonesia, BnBc Advertising Sdn Bhd and BnBc Events and Promotions Sdn Bhd in Malaysia, Clever Brand Strategy Co. Ltd in Taiwan, and P.0.P. House in Thailand.

In 2005, FM was one of only five recipients to receive the Enterprise 50 Award – an annual business award recognising Singapore's most promising privately held companies.

In 2006, Mark was awarded one of the Top Entrepreneurs of the Year Awards (organised by the
Association of Small and Medium Enterprises (ASME) and the Rotary Club of Singapore) – one of the highest business award recognitions in Singapore, and one that no trained designer had ever attained previously.

In 2007, Mark was also selected as one of the finalists in Singapore's top design accolade – the President's Design Award.

Principal
In 2006, Mark founded First Media Design School (FMDS), a boutique private design institution that offers diploma, advanced diploma and degree programs in the areas Graphic design, Multimedia and Fashion design. Its Bachelor's degree program is conferred by the University of the West of England(UWE).

The institution's mission statement specifies that FMDS strives to cultivate a new generation of 'whole brain' trained, industry-ready designers who possess both creative and commercial cognitive abilities, through its holistic design thinking and design management teaching system. Its teaching methodology is partly derived from the Herrmann Brain Dominance Instrument system.

The students enrolled in FMDS consist of a mixture of local and international students, mostly from Indonesia and China. FMDS equips career starters and career switchers with the necessary skills to go from mere practitioner to business-owner. In an interview in 2006, when Mark was asked about how he envisions FMDS to be different from other design schools in Singapore, he said:

Books
In 2013, Mark co-authored Think like a Sage, Work like a Fool, Act like a Criminal, which consists of his biography, and a compilation of business theories, life lessons and personal reflections garnered from the early years of his career as a designpreneur to the present.

References

External links
 First Media Pte Ltd Official Website

Singaporean businesspeople
Singaporean people of Chinese descent
Living people
Singaporean educators
Education International
Singaporean Christians
1962 births
21st-century Singaporean educators
20th-century Singaporean businesspeople